Final standings of the 1970–71 Hungarian League season

Final standings
Extra points were awarded to the teams according to their position in the 1970 Spring Championship. The winner of each group received 8 points, whilst the remaining teams got 7-1 points according their standing.

Results

Statistical leaders

Top goalscorers

External links
 IFFHS link

Nemzeti Bajnokság I seasons
1970–71 in Hungarian football
Hun